Cor van Aanholt (born 29 March 1959) is a sailor who represented the Netherlands Antilles. He competed in the Laser event at the 2000 Summer Olympics.

References

External links
 

1959 births
Living people
Dutch Antillean male sailors (sport)
Olympic sailors of the Netherlands Antilles
Sailors at the 2000 Summer Olympics – Laser
Sportspeople from Groningen (city)